Nasser Jamal (born February 25, 1988 in Kandahar, Afghanistan and raised in Queensborough, British Columbia and the Downtown Eastside) is a professional Canadian football offensive lineman who is currently a free agent. He most recently played for the Toronto Argonauts of the Canadian Football League. He was drafted 40th overall by the Argonauts in the 2009 CFL Draft and signed with the team on April 4, 2011, taking time off to complete his degree and pursue NFL interests. He was ranked as a top 5 draft pick, but fell in rankings due to increased interest from the NFL and injury. He was later released on July 20, 2011 due to injuries sustained during practice. He played NCAA Division 1A college football for the Louisiana–Lafayette Ragin' Cajuns where he was a 3-year letter winner and recipient of multiple academic awards.

References

1988 births
Living people
Canadian football offensive linemen
Louisiana Ragin' Cajuns football players
People from New Westminster
Toronto Argonauts players
Sportspeople from Kandahar
Afghan emigrants to Canada